Nanten  is the Japanese for "southern sky". It may refer to:
 The plant Nandina, which is a latinised form of the same name
 8210 NANTEN, asteroid named after a telescope of the same name